The Eleventh Day: Single Collection  is Japanese recording artist Gackt's greatest hits album released on July 21, 2010.

It includes all of his singles released in the last five years until then, and it his second single collection after The Sixth Day: Single Collection released in 2004. The album was released by his former label Nippon Crown, and it is his last album with the label after he transferred to Avex Group's recording conglomerate.

Track listing

Chart performance

Oricon sales charts

Billboard Japan

References

External links
 Crown Record

Gackt compilation albums
2010 greatest hits albums